James Little (born 1952) is an American painter and curator. He is known for his works of geometric abstraction which are often imbued with exuberant color. He has been based in New York City.

Early life and education 
Little was born in 1952 in Memphis, Tennessee, and grew up in the segregated American South. He is from an African American family.

He studied at the Memphis Academy of Art (now known as Memphis College of Art), while a student his work was praised and selected in 1973 for an exhibition at the Arkansas Arts Center by Gerald Nordland. He received his BFA degree from Memphis Academy of Art in 1974. In 1976, Little obtained his MFA degree from Syracuse University in Syracuse, New York.

Career 
Little cites Mitchell along with Barnett Newman, Mark Rothko, Franz Kline, Alma Thomas, and George L. K. Morris as among the artists whose work he most admires. He has said of the modus operandi of his own work (that)......"Abstraction provided me with self-determination and free will. It was liberating. I don’t find freedom in any other form. People like to have an answer before they have the experience. Abstraction doesn’t offer you that." "orchestrations of geometry and chroma to delight our eyes and stir our emotions and intellect...”.

In 1976, his work was the subject of the solo exhibition Paintings by James Little curated by Ronald Kutcha at the Everson Museum in Syracuse. In 1980, Little's work was included in the exhibition "Afro-American Abstraction", curated by April Kingsley, at MoMA PS1.
 

In 2002, Little's large commission for the Metropolitan Transportation Authority was unveiled. Riders at Jamaica Station now travel through his 85-foot-long environment made of 33 multicolored laminated glass panels in a prismatic design, each measuring at 17-feet tall by 5-feet wide.

In 2020, some of Little's large-scale black-tone paintings were shown in a two-artist exhibition with the work of Louise Nevelson, who was represented exclusively by the black colored sculptures, for which she is most known. The exhibition titled Louise Nevelson + James Little ran from September 3, 2020 until October 28, 2020 at Rosenbaum Contemporary in Boca Raton, Florida. 

Little's work was included in the 2022 Whitney Biennial. 

Little currently teaches at the Art Students League of New York. Little was formerly represented by the June Kelly Gallery in Manhattan and is now represented by Louis Stern Fine Arts in West Hollywood and the Kavi Gupta Gallery in Chicago where his work will be the subject of a forthcoming solo exhibition in November 2022.

His work is the subject of the 2005 paperback edition James Little: Reaching for the Sky which features 13 color reproductions of his pieces and essays by Robert C. Morgan, George N'Namdi, Al Loving, Robert Costa, Horace Brockington, and James Haritas.

Awards 
In 2009, Little won a Joan Mitchell Foundation award. He has also been the recipient of a Pollock-Krasner Foundation grant.

Curation
In 2019 Little curated the exhibition "New York Centric" at the American Fine Arts Society gallery which included the work of multiple generations of abstract artists associated with the great Metropolis including Alma Thomas, Alvin Loving, Larry Poons, Stanley Boxer, Peter Reginato, Dan Christensen, Ronnie Landfield, Gabriele Evertz, Charles Hinman, Thornton Willis, Doug Ohlson, Robert Swain, and Ed Clark.

Solo exhibitions
2021	Chromatic Rhythm - James Little: Paintings on Paper, Sarah Moody Gallery of Art, University of Alabama, Tuscaloosa, Alabama and Ewing Gallery of Art + Architecture, University of Tennessee, Knoxville, Tennessee
2020	James Little: Dots and Slants, Louis Stern Fine Arts, West Hollywood, CA
2018	Slants and White Paintings, June Kelly Gallery, New York
2016	Informed by Rhythm: Recent Work by James Little, Louis Stern Fine Arts, West Hollywood, CA
2015	Color/Barriers: Recent Work, essay by James Harithas, June Kelly Gallery, New York
2013	Never Say Never, essay by Karen Wilkin, June Kelly Gallery, New York
2011	Ex Pluribus Unum: New Paintings, essay by Mario Naves, June Kelly Gallery, New York
2009	De-Classified, Recent Paintings, essay by James Harithas, June Kelly Gallery, New York
2007	James Little: Untold Stories, Station Museum of Contemporary Art, Houston, TX
2005	Reaching for the Sky, essays by Robert Costas, James Harithas, Al Loving, G. R.;N’Namdi Gallery, New York; catalogue
2003  Beyond Geometry: New Paintings, essay by Robert C. Morgan, L.I.C.K. Ltd. Fine Art, Long Island City, NY
1995	Recent Abstract Paintings, Kenkeleba Gallery, New York
1992	James Little: Selected Works from the Past Decade, Lubin House Gallery, Syracuse University, New York
1990	Tondos and Ovals, essay by April Kingsley, June Kelly Gallery, New York
1989	James Little: Recent Paintings, The Christian Science Church, Boston, MA
1988	James Little & Al Loving: New Work, June Kelly Gallery, New York
1987	New Paintings, Liz Harris Gallery, Boston, MA
1985	James Little: Format Paintings, Harris Brown Gallery, Boston, MA
1982	Recent Oil Paintings, essay by April Kingsley, Alternative Museum, New York
1976 Paintings by James Little, curated by Ronald Kuchta, Everson Museum of Art, Syracuse, NY

Group exhibitions
2022	Whitney Biennial 2022: Quiet as It's Kept, Whitney Museum of American Art, New York
2021	The Dirty South: Contemporary Art, Material Culture, and the Sonic Impulse, Virginia Museum of Fine Arts, Richmond, Virginia
2019	New York Centric, Art Students League of New York, New York
2019	The Shape of Abstraction: Selections from the Ollie Collection, St. Louis Art Museum, St. Louis, Missouri
2018	Color/Line/Form, Rosenbaum Contemporary, Boca Raton, Florida
2018	The Masters: Teachers and Their Students, Art Students League of New York and Hirschl and Adler Modern, New York
2017	Celebrating 30 Years, Gallery Artists: Drawings and Photographs, June Kelly Gallery, New York
2016–2017	Circa 1970, curated by Lauren Haynes, Studio Museum in Harlem, New York
Beyond Borders: Bill Hutson & Friends, University Museums, Mechanical Hall Gallery, University of Delaware
2015	Decoding the Abstract Unlimited Potential, curated by James Austin Murray, Lyons WierGallery, New York
Outside the Lines: Color Across the Collections, curated by Tricia Laughlin Bloom, organized by the Newark Museum, NJ
Works on Paper: Selections from the Gallery, Louis Stern Fine Arts, West Hollywood, CA.
2014 Black in the Abstract, Part 2: Hard Edges, Soft Curves, organized by Valerie Cassel Oliver, Contemporary Arts Museum Houston, TX, catalogue
 2012	Today’s Visual Language: Southern Abstraction, A Fresh Look, curated by Donan Klooz, curator
of exhibitions, Mobile Museum of Art, AL; digital catalogue
What Only Paint Can Do, curated by Karen Wilkin, Triangle Arts Association, Brooklyn, NY
2011 ABSTRACTION (Abstraction to the Power of Infinity), curated by Janet Kurnatowski, organized by the American Abstract Artists, The Ice Box, Crane Arts, Philadelphia, PA
2010	Abstract Relations, collaboration between the David C. Driskell Center, University of Maryland and the University of Delaware Museums, co-curators Dr. Julie L. McGee and Dr. Adrienne L. Childs, University of Delaware, Mechanical Hall Gallery, Mineralogical Museum, Newark, DE
It’s A Wonderful 10th, Sideshow Gallery, Brooklyn, NY
2008 Shape Shifters: New YorkPainters, The A.D. Gallery, University of North Carolina at Pembroke; catalogue
2007 Three One-Man Exhibitions: James Little, Aimé Mpane, George Smith, Station Museum of Contemporary Art, Houston, TX; brochure
2006 The 181st Annual Invitational Exhibition of Contemporary American Art, National Academy of Design, New York; catalogue Neo-Plastic Redux, Elizabeth Harris Gallery, New York
2005 Different Ways of Seeing: The Expanding World of Abstraction,
The Noyes Museum of Contemporary Art, Oceanville, NJ
Optical Stimulations: American Abstract Artists, Yellow Bird Gallery, Newburgh, NY 50 Plus, Holland Tunnel Gallery, Brooklyn, NY
Raising the Bar: James Little and Thornton Willis, Sideshow Gallery, Brooklyn, NY
2004 Seeds and Roots: Selections from the Permanent Collection, The Studio Museum in Harlem, New York
A Century of African American Art: The Paul R. Jones Collection, University of Delaware, Newark, DE
Abstract Identity, Pelham Art Center, NY
2003 Theories: Abstract New York, Roger Ramsay Gallery, Chicago, IL
2002	No Greater Love, Abstraction, Jack Tilton/Anna Kustera Gallery, New York
Ajita – Unconquerable, The Station, Houston, TX; catalogue
500 Works on Paper, Gary Snyder Fine Art, New York
Amplified Abstraction, Chapel, Plantage, Doklaan 8-12, Amsterdam, Holland
2001 Painted in New York City: Viewpoints of Recent Developments in Abstract Painting, Hofstra
Museum, Hofstra University, Hempstead, NY; catalogue
Dialog and Discourse, Dolan Center Gallery, Friends Academy, Locust Valley, NY
2000 Significant Pursuits: Paint and Geometry, Smack Mellon Studios, Brooklyn, NY
Straight Painting, The Painting Center, New York
1999 Straight No Chaser, The Puffin Room, The Puffin Foundation, New York
The Art of Absolute Desire, 450 Broadway, New York
The Power of Drawing, Westbeth Gallery, New York
1998 New Directions ‘98’ 14th Annual National Juried Fine Arts Exhibition, Duchess County Art
Association, Barrett Art Center, Poughkeepsie, NY
New York Eight, Luise Ross Gallery, New York
Works On, With and Made Out of Paper, Sideshow 195, Brooklyn, NY
The African-American Fine Arts Collection of the New Jersey State Museum, New Jersey State
Museum, Trenton, NJ
Postcards from Black America, curated by Rob Perrée, De Beyerd, Center for Contemporary Art
in Breda, Netherlands, and the Frans Hals Museum, Haarlem, Netherlands; catalogue
de leugenaars/the liars (I) Helder en Verzadigd Clear and Saturated, Arti et Amicitiae, Amsterdam,
Holland
Color, Matter, Energy, Galerie Maria Chailloux, Hogeschool van Amsterdam, Holland

References

1952 births
Living people
Abstract artists

20th-century American painters

American curators
African-American painters
African-American curators

People from Tennessee
Syracuse University alumni
21st-century American painters